The diffuse extragalactic background radiation (DEBRA) refers to the diffuse photon field from extragalactic origin that fills our Universe. It contains photons over ~20 decades of energy from ~10−7 eV to ~100 GeV. The origin and the physical processes involved are different within every wavelength range. There is plenty of observational evidence that support the existence of the DEBRA.
The figure shows a schematic picture, based on many different data sets, of the spectral intensity (also called spectral radiance) multiplied by wavelength of the DEBRA over all the electromagnetic spectrum. This representation is convenient because the area inside the curve is the energy. The nature and history of the universe is coded in this radiation field and any realistic cosmological model must be able to describe it. Understanding the DEBRA is a major challenge of modern cosmology with huge consequences in other fields of astrophysics, therefore extraordinary efforts are being put by theoreticians, observers, and instrumentalists to do so.

Regions of the DEBRA
The overall diffuse extragalactic radiation field may be divided in different regions according to their origin and physical processes involved. This is a standard classification from the highest down to the lowest energies:

 Diffuse extragalactic gamma-ray radiation (also known as cosmic gamma-ray background)
 Cosmic X-ray background
 Extragalactic background light (which includes the cosmic infrared background)
 Cosmic microwave background
 Cosmic radio background

References

External links
 Caltech papers

Extragalactic astronomy
Cosmic rays
Cosmic background radiation
Unsolved problems in astronomy